The 13th Pan American Games were held in Winnipeg, Manitoba, Canada from July 23 to August 8, 1999.

Medals

Silver

 Men's Team Competition: Honduras national football team

Results by event

See also
 Honduras at the 2000 Summer Olympics

Nations at the 1999 Pan American Games
P
1999